A Dictionary of Old Norse Prose (Danish: Ordbog over det norrøne prosasprog), abbreviated as ONP, is a dictionary of the vocabulary attested in medieval West Scandinavian prose texts. The dictionary is funded through the Arnamagnæan Commission and is based in the Department of Nordic Studies and Linguistics at the University of Copenhagen. The project began in 1939 and was intended to supplement Johan Fritzner’s Ordbog over det gamle norske Sprog and other nineteenth century lexicographical works. Work on the first printed volume began in 1989. Three more volumes were printed with the last appearing in 2004. In 2005 the dictionary moved to freely available online publication.

Editors 

 Aldís Sigurðardóttir
 Alex Speed Kjeldsen
 Bent Chr. Jacobsen
 Christopher Sanders
 Ellert Þór Jóhannsson
 Eva Rode
 Helle Degnbol
 James E. Knirk
 Maria Arvidsson
 Simonetta Battista
 Tarrin Wills
 Þorbjörg Helgadóttir

External links 

 Official website
 ONP: Dictionary of Old Norse Prose on Facebook
 ONP on Twitter

References 

Dictionaries
Old Norse